Danna is both a given name and a surname. Notable people with the name include:

Given name:
Danna Mohamed of the Maldives, Sultan of the Maldives in 1421
Danna García (born 1978), Colombian actress
Danna Paola (born 1995), Mexican actress and singer
Danna Vale (born 1944), Australian politician and former member of the Australian House of Representatives

Surname:
Jeff Danna (born 1964), Canadian composer and musician
Mike Danna (born 1997), American football player
Mychael Danna (born 1958), Canadian film composer; brother of Jeff Danna

English feminine given names
Feminine given names